M.B.C. Institute of Engineering and Technology, established in 1893 (as the oldest government polytechnic in West Bengal) is a Govt. Polytechnic college affiliated to West Bengal State Council Of Technical Education, located in Sadhanpur,  Purba Bardhaman district.

About college
It is affiliated to the West Bengal State Council of Technical Education,  and recognised by AICTE, New Delhi. It offers diploma courses in Electronics & Telecommunication, Electrical, Mechanical  and Civil Engineering. The intake is 300 students for Diploma courses annually. This college is approved by the Government of West Bengal and All India Council for Technical Education (AICTE).

Location
The nearest airport is at Kolkata about one and a half hours' drive through NH2. Burdwan is well connected through rail and road with the rest of India.

Admission procedure
Admission in the first year (regular entry) and second year (lateral entry) to the diploma courses are based on the merit list of JEXPO and VOCLET exam respectively conducted by West Bengal State Council of Technical Education.

Departments 
{| class="wikitable"
|-
! Discipline !!  Available Seats
|-
|Electrical Engineering(DEE)  || 60
|-
|Electronics and Tele-Communication Engineering(DETCE) || 60
|-
|Mechanical Engineering(DME) || 60
|-
|Civil Engineering(DCE) || 90
|-
|
aaru vannalum sport admission kanum

Library & centers
In the college there is a library, study facility, language room, common room and seminar hall.

See also

References

External links
Official website WBSCTE
M.B.C College

Universities and colleges in Purba Bardhaman district
Educational institutions established in 1893
1893 establishments in India
Technical universities and colleges in West Bengal